Speeders is an American traffic crime reality television program that was broadcast on truTV (then known as Court TV at the time of this show's debut). The program debuted in the mid-2007, and aired through 2009.

Unlike the more action-packed and felony-oriented show COPS, this program consists of clips of individuals being pulled over for minor offenses, most commonly speeding, as well as other things such as seat belt and other equipment violations, and is more comedy-oriented. The entertainment is derived from the interaction between the offender and the police officers. More specifically, the excuses that offenders give for why they allegedly committed the violation. To wrap up most episodes, a "Classic Clip" is shown, where they show a police dashcam video about a routine stop. These videos originate from the 90's and were filmed by various police departments.

Departments featured
Abington Police Department
Washington State Patrol
Florida Highway Patrol
California Highway Patrol
Long Beach Police Department
Oak Lawn Police Department
Redondo Beach Police Department
Laguna Beach Police Department
Akron Police Department
Belmar Police Department
Travis County Sheriffs Office
Peabody Police Department
Brick Township Police Department
Rutland Police Department
Burbank Police Department
Los Angeles Police Department
Azusa Police Department
Orange County, California Sheriff's Department
Rialto Police Department
Glendale Police Department
Oxnard Police Department
Markham Police Department
Calvert County Sheriff's Office
Portsmouth Police Department
Concord Police Department
Toms River Police Department
Alexandria Police Department
Ithaca Police Department
Beverly Hills Police Department
Bay County Sheriffs Office
Chattanooga Police Department
Ann Arbor Police Department
Greensboro Police Department
Plantation Police Department
Milwaukee Police Department
St.Tammany Parish Sheriffs Office
Topeka Police Department
Alpharetta Police Department

International broadcast
In the United Kingdom, it was shown on Dave. In Latin America, it aired on truTV Latin America. It aired on Action in Canada. In Spain the program was broadcast on Energy, and in Finland on Jim.

See also
Speeders Fight Back, a spin-off nontraditional court show of Speeders where the offending motorists take their cases to court

External links 
 Speeders on TruTV
 

2007 American television series debuts
2009 American television series endings
2000s American reality television series
American hidden camera television series
English-language television shows
TruTV original programming